Kanja Odland Roshi is a Zen Buddhist priest and teacher, in the lineage of Harada-Yasutani.  She was born in Stockholm 1963.

She started her Zen training in 1984, as a student of both Roshi Philip Kapleau and his successor Roshi Bodhin Kjolhede. She was ordained as a priest in 1999. She also finished her koan training that year, and was given permission to teach by Roshi Kjolhede in 2001. She has been teaching full-time since then. Together with her co-teacher Sante Poromaa Roshi, she has been instrumental in the creation of a full-time training temple in rural Sweden called Zengården, as well as the growth and development of a network of City Zen Centers in Sweden, Finland and Scotland. Odland offers regular sesshin (meditation retreats), in English and regularly gives public talks on Zen. Her first book, Vandring på Spårlös Stig, was published in 2013.

Notes

References 
 https://web.archive.org/web/20110719235643/http://www.rzc.org/node/38/lineage

External links 
 www.zentraining.orgwww.zazen.sewww.zazen.fiwww.stockholmzencenter.seglasgowcloudwaterzen.orgwww.lundzencenter.se www.goteborgzencenter.se

Galleries

Zengården

1963 births
Living people
Zen Buddhist priests
Zen Buddhist nuns